US Indoor Championships may refer to:

 USA Indoor Track and Field Championships, annual senior national indoor track and field championships
 U.S. National Indoor Championships (1898–2014), defunct indoor tennis tournament
 U.S. Women's Indoor Championships (1907–2001), defunct women's indoor national tennis championship